Christian Knees (born 5 March 1981) is a German former professional road racing cyclist, who rode professionally between 2004 and 2020, for the Wiesenhof,  and  teams. He won the German National Road Race Championship in 2010. In 2011 he was originally going to join the Australian team known as Pegasus but left after they failed to secure a UCI Professional Continental license. He ultimately joined  as a domestique. He remained with the team as a rider until announcing his retirement from the sport in December 2020, moving into a role within the team's racing and performance areas.

Major results

2001
 3rd Overall Rás Tailteann
1st Stage 5
2004
 6th Overall The Peace Race
1st  Young rider classification
 6th Overall Ytong Bohemia Tour
 7th Grote Prijs Stad Zottegem
 7th Rund um Düren
 7th Alpbach Rad Classic
2005
 2nd Overall Sachsen-Tour
 4th Grand Prix Pino Cerami
 6th Overall Ster Elektrotoer
 7th Overall Tour de Luxembourg
 7th Overall Hessen Rundfahrt
 8th Ronde van Drenthe
2006
 1st Rund um Köln
 4th Overall 3-Länder-Tour
2007
 2nd Road race, National Road Championships
 3rd Eindhoven Team Time Trial
2008
 1st  Overall Bayern Rundfahrt
 2nd Sparkassen Giro Bochum
 5th Rund um den Henninger Turm
 9th Overall Tour de Suisse
2009
 3rd Rund um den Henninger Turm
 8th Brabantse Pijl
 10th Overall Tour of the Basque Country
 10th Gran Premio di Lugano
 10th Amstel Gold Race
2010
 1st  Road race, National Road Championships
2012
 7th Overall Bayern Rundfahrt
 9th Overall Tour of Britain
2013
 1st Stage 2 (TTT) Giro d'Italia
 1st Stage 1b (TTT) Giro del Trentino
2016
 1st Stage 1 (TTT) Vuelta a España
2019
 1st  Mountains classification Herald Sun Tour

Grand Tour general classification results timeline

References

External links

 
 Christian Knees profile at Team Sky
 

1981 births
Living people
German male cyclists
Sportspeople from Bonn
German cycling road race champions
Cyclists from North Rhine-Westphalia
21st-century German people